Paul Anthony Cahill (born 21 June 1975) is an Irish hurler who played as a right corner-back for the Kilkenny senior hurling team.

Cahill joined the Kilkenny senior team during the 2002 National League and was a member of the team for just one season. During that time he won a set of All-Ireland and National Hurling League winners' medals as a substitute. He played several league games that season. He also represented Kilkenny at under 21 and intermediate level.

At club level, Cahill is a one-time  senior hurling county winning medalist with Dunnamaggin. He was also the first hurling captain for his club at minor A, under 21 A and the only senior club winning captain with Dunnamaggin to date. He won five Inter Firms senior All Irelands with Suir Engineering.

References

1976 births
Living people
Dunnamaggin hurlers
Kilkenny inter-county hurlers